"E depois do adeus" ("And After the Farewell") is a song recorded by Portuguese singer Paulo de Carvalho, written by José Calvário and José Niza. It is best known as the  entry at the Eurovision Song Contest 1974, held in Brighton, after winning Festival da Canção 1974.

The song's airing on 24 April 1974 at 10:55 p.m. on Emissores Associados de Lisboa Radio Station, was one of the two secret signals which alerted the rebel captains and soldiers to begin the Carnation Revolution.

Description 
The song is a ballad, with Paulo de Carvalho taking the role of a man who is faced with the end of a relationship. He tells his lover how he feels, likening her to "a flower that I picked", implying that the relationship was of a comparatively short duration. He also comments on the nature of love itself, singing that it is "winning and losing".

The song was performed sixteenth on the night, following 's Piera Martell with "Mein Ruf nach dir" and preceding 's Gigliola Cinquetti with "Sì". At the close of voting, it had received 3 points, placing 14th (and tying for last with Switzerland,  and ) in a field of 17.

It was succeeded as Portuguese entry at the 1975 contest by Duarte Mendes with "Madrugada".

Signal for 1974 Portuguese revolution 
Despite the modest showing in Brighton at the contest itself, the song achieved considerable fame as one of the two signals to launch the Carnation Revolution in Portugal against the Estado Novo regime of Américo Tomás and Marcello Caetano – the other being the folk song "Grândola, Vila Morena" by Zeca Afonso, which was the signal for the coup leaders to announce that they had taken control of strategic parts of the country. It was broadcast at 22.55 on 24 April 1974 by Emissores Associados de Lisboa.

Histories of the contest tend to take a facetious view of this fact. In his The Eurovision Song Contest: The Official History, author John Kennedy O'Connor, for example, describes it as "the only Eurovision entry to have actually started a revolution", while Des Mangan suggests that other Portuguese entries (he mentions 's "Se eu te pudesse abraçar") would not be likely to inspire coups.

References 

Songs about parting
Carnation Revolution
Eurovision songs of 1974
Eurovision songs of Portugal
Portuguese-language songs
1974 songs